Iota Antliae, Latinized from ι Antliae, is a single, orange-hued star in the southern constellation of Antlia. It has an apparent visual magnitude of +4.60, making it a faint naked eye star. It is drifting further away with a radial velocity of 2 km/s.

The spectrum of Iota Antliae matches a stellar classification of K1 III, indicating that this is an evolved star that is now in its giant phase. Having exhausted the supply of hydrogen at its core, the star has expanded and it now spans 12 times the radius of the Sun. It is a red clump giant, indicating it is on the horizontal branch and is generating energy through helium fusion. The star is 3.32 billion years old with 1.55 times the Sun's mass. It is radiating 67 times the luminosity of the Sun from its swollen photosphere at an effective temperature of 4,892 K.

References

K-type giants
Horizontal-branch stars

Antlia
Antliae, Iota
Durchmusterung objects
094890
053502
4273